Raphaël Adelino José Guerreiro  (born 22 December 1993) is a professional footballer who plays as left-back or as a midfielder for Bundesliga club Borussia Dortmund and the Portugal national team.

He began his career at Caen, signing in 2013 with Lorient where he made his Ligue 1 debut. In June 2016, he joined Borussia Dortmund.

Born in France, Guerreiro represented Portugal at under-21 and senior level, first appearing for the latter in 2014. He was part of their squad at two World Cups and two European Championships, winning Euro 2016.

Club career

Caen
Born in Le Blanc-Mesnil, Seine-Saint-Denis to a Portuguese father and a French mother, Guerreiro played youth football for three clubs, finishing his formation at Stade Malherbe Caen after signing in 2008 at the age of 14. After starting as a senior with the reserve team he made his professional debut in the 2012–13 season, appearing in all the games and failing to start only once in an eventual fourth-place finish in Ligue 2; he was also elected to the Team of the Year.

Lorient
On 27 June 2013, Guerreiro moved to Ligue 1 after signing a four-year contract with FC Lorient. His maiden appearance in the competition took place on 10 August, as he featured the full 90 minutes in a 1–0 away loss against Lille OSC.

On 1 November 2014, Guerreiro scored his first goal for Lorient, opening the scoring at title-holders Paris Saint-Germain F.C. but in an eventual 2–1 defeat. He finished the campaign with seven goals to help his team stave off relegation, including the equaliser as they came from behind to defeat his former employers 2–1 at the Stade du Moustoir.

Guerreiro opened the scoring in a Derby Breton on 24 October 2015, assisted by Majeed Waris in a 1–1 home draw against Stade Rennais FC.

Borussia Dortmund
On 16 June 2016, Borussia Dortmund signed Guerreiro to a four-year contract for a reported fee of €12 million (£9.5 million). Under coach Thomas Tuchel, he was primarily deployed as a midfielder.

Guerreiro scored his first goal in the UEFA Champions League on 14 September 2016, in a 6–0 away win against Legia Warsaw in the group phase. In the 2018–19 edition of the competition, and also at that stage, he added braces in victories over Atlético Madrid (4–0, home) and AS Monaco FC (2–0).

International career

Guerreiro accepted the call to represent the Portugal under-21 team after being spotted by Rui Jorge's coaching staff, making his debut on 21 March 2013 in a 0–1 home defeat against Sweden. On 7 November 2014, even though he hardly spoke the language, he was called up by Fernando Santos to the full side, for a UEFA Euro 2016 qualifier against Armenia and a friendly with Argentina. He made his debut on 14 November against the former opponent, playing the entire 1–0 win in Faro. Four days later, against Argentina, he scored in the last minute for the only goal at Old Trafford.

Guerreiro returned to the under-21s for the 2015 UEFA European Championship in the Czech Republic, helping them finish in second place. He was one of five Portuguese included in the Team of the Tournament.

Guerreiro was selected by the main squad for their UEFA Euro 2016 campaign, playing the full 90 minutes in the first game, a 1–1 draw with Iceland in Saint-Étienne. Portugal went on to win the competition, defeating hosts France 1–0 in the final in extra time; following his performances throughout the competition, he was nominated for the Young Player of the Tournament Award, which ultimately went to his teammate Renato Sanches.

In spite of an injury-riddled season, Guerreiro was picked for the 2018 FIFA World Cup. He started four matches in Russia, in a round-of-16 exit.

Guerreiro also made the squad for UEFA Euro 2020. He opened the 3–0 victory over Hungary in the first group fixture, but scored an own goal the following one in a 4–2 loss to Germany.

In November 2022, Guerreiro was named in the final squad for the 2022 FIFA World Cup. On 6 December, he scored his team's fourth in an eventual 6–1 rout of Switzerland in Lusail in the round of 16.

Personal life
In 2014, Guerreiro said that he supported S.L. Benfica, dreamed of playing for Real Madrid and his favourite player was Cristiano Ronaldo. His Portugal under-21 manager, Rui Jorge, remembered him as a very introverted character, in part due to his language difficulties.

Guerreiro and his family used to watch matches of the Portugal national team, of which Pauleta was a footballer he admired.

Career statistics

Club

International

Portugal score listed first, score column indicates score after each Guerreiro goal.

Honours
Borussia Dortmund
DFB-Pokal: 2016–17, 2020–21
DFL-Supercup: 2019

Portugal
UEFA European Championship: 2016
UEFA Nations League: 2018–19
FIFA Confederations Cup third place: 2017

Individual
UEFA European Under-21 Championship Team of the Tournament: 2015
UEFA European Championship Team of the Tournament: 2016
UEFA Champions League Breakthrough XI: 2016

Orders
 Commander of the Order of Merit

References

External links

National team data 

1993 births
Living people
People from Le Blanc-Mesnil
French people of Portuguese descent
Citizens of Portugal through descent
Portuguese people of French descent
French footballers
Portuguese footballers
Footballers from Seine-Saint-Denis
Association football defenders
Association football midfielders
Ligue 1 players
Ligue 2 players
INF Clairefontaine players
Stade Malherbe Caen players
FC Lorient players
Bundesliga players
Borussia Dortmund players
Portugal under-21 international footballers
Portugal international footballers
UEFA Euro 2016 players
2017 FIFA Confederations Cup players
2018 FIFA World Cup players
UEFA Euro 2020 players
2022 FIFA World Cup players
UEFA European Championship-winning players
UEFA Nations League-winning players
French expatriate footballers
Portuguese expatriate footballers
Expatriate footballers in Germany
French expatriate sportspeople in Germany
Portuguese expatriate sportspeople in Germany
Commanders of the Order of Merit (Portugal)